() is a Hebrew term for a concubine, a marital companion of social and legal status inferior to that of a wife. Among the Israelites, men commonly acknowledged their concubines, and such women enjoyed the same rights in the house as legitimate wives.

Etymology 
In Judaism, concubines are referred to by the Hebrew term .

In the Hebrew of the contemporary State of Israel,  is often used as the equivalent of the English word mistress—i.e., the female partner in extramarital relations—regardless of legal recognition. Attempts have been initiated to popularise  as a form of premarital, non-marital or extramarital relationship (which, according to the perspective of the enacting person(s), is permitted by Jewish law).

There are many definitions for what a  relationship is. In the Eastern world,  fit into the complex family organization and the woman had more of a distinct legal and social position, whereas in the later Western world,  was regarded as a long-term sex companionship between a man and a woman who could not or would not be married.

Biblical references 
Several biblical figures had concubines when they were not able to create natural children with their wives. The most famous example of this was with Abraham and Sarah. Sarah gave her maidservant Hagar to Abraham while maintaining ownership of both maidservant and offspring. Their union produced Ishmael. Hagar gained the status of full wife in regards to Abraham, but nonetheless Sarah retained the status of main wife. 

Since having children in Judaism was considered a great blessing, legitimate wives often gave their maids to their husbands so they could have children with them when those women themselves were childless, as in the cases of Leah and Zilpah and Rachel and Bilhah. The concubine commanded the same respect and inviolability as the wife, and it was regarded as the deepest dishonor for the man to whom she belonged if hands were laid upon her. Even in the exceptional case of Sarah and Hagar, Abraham would have been obligated to treat Hagar as a full wife and she would have been treated as an equal by Abraham. Sarah's rights would have been regarding the technical legal status of being considered the inheritor and since the other wife and offspring would have been hers by ownership she became  the legal albeit not biological mother of Ishmael.

Legal characteristics 
According to Rabbi Judah, however, the  should also receive a marriage contract, but without including a clause specifying a divorce settlement. According to Rashi, "wives with kiddushin and ketubbah, concubines with kiddushin but without ketubbah"; this reading is from the Jerusalem Talmud.

Certain rabbis, such as Maimonides, believed that concubines are strictly reserved for kings, and thus that a commoner may not have a concubine; indeed, such thinkers argued that commoners may not engage in any type of sexual relations outside of a marriage. Maimonides was not the first Jewish thinker to criticize concubinage; for example, it is severely condemned in Leviticus Rabbah. Other rabbis, such as Nachmanides, Samuel ben Uri Shraga Phoebus, and Jacob Emden, strongly object to the idea that concubines should be forbidden.

The leaders of the  controversy are Maimonides and Nahmanides. Maimonides believed  should be prohibited legally while Nahmaides believed in permitting legally but discouraging ethically.

 was a way for a man with many resources to care for women other than the wife, bring in another woman to help his wife with her duties, have offspring if his wife was infertile, and create companionship without legal ties.

See also

References

External links 
 
 
 

Jewish marital law
Concubinage

he:פילגש#פילגשים ביהדות